Kymenlaakso University of Applied Sciences (KyAMK) was a university of applied sciences in the region of Kymenlaakso located in Kotka and Kouvola. Kymenlaakso University of Applied Sciences was established in 1996, and ceased to operate at the end of 2016, when it merged with Mikkeli University of Applied Sciences to form South-Eastern Finland University of Applied Sciences (Xamk).

References

External links
www.xamk.fi

Universities and colleges in Finland
Educational institutions established in 1996
Universities and colleges formed by merger in Finland
1996 establishments in Finland